Erich Schröder (20 November 1898 – 24 December 1975) was a German footballer who played as a defender and made one appearance for the Germany national team.

Career
Schröder earned his first and only cap for Germany on 26 April 1931 in a friendly against the Netherlands. The away match, which was played in Amsterdam, finished as a 1–1 draw.

Personal life
Schröder died on 24 December 1975 at the age of 77.

Career statistics

International

References

External links
 
 
 
 
 

1898 births
1975 deaths
Footballers from Dresden
German footballers
Germany international footballers
Association football defenders
Dresdner SC players
FC Viktoria Köln players